Reflections of China is a Circle-Vision 360° movie at the China Pavilion at Epcot, part of Epcot's World Showcase at Walt Disney World Resort in Florida. The show is narrated by an actor playing Li Bai, an ancient Chinese poet, who takes the viewer on a tour of the Chinese countryside and historical structures and buildings. Some sites that are seen are The Great Wall of China, The Forbidden City in Beijing, the Terracotta Army in Xi'an, Hunan, Guilin, Suzhou, Hong Kong, and Shanghai.

Reflections of China updated Wonders of China, a similar movie. Reflections of China will be replaced by a new film, Wondrous China, which was originally set to open in 2021, as part of Walt Disney World's 50th anniversary celebration. However, it was delayed to 2023, since the opening date was postponed indefinitely following the closure of the park due to the COVID-19 pandemic.

See also
 Epcot
 Epcot attraction and entertainment history

References

External links 
 Walt Disney World Resort - Reflections of China

Walt Disney Parks and Resorts attractions
Epcot
Circle-Vision 360° films
American documentary films
Documentary films about China
World Showcase
2003 establishments in Florida
2023 disestablishments in Florida